Balwant Singh may refer to:

Politics

Royalty
 Balwant Singh of Benares (1711–1770), Maharaja of Benares State 1740–1770
 Balwant Singh of Bharatpur (1820–1853), Maharaja of Bharatpur 1825–1853
 Raja Balwant Singh (1770–97) - 6th Raja of Raghogarh-Vijaypur
 Raja Balwant Singh of Jasrota (formerly Balwant Dev), 18th century, subject of paintings by Nainsukh 
 Raja Balwant Singh of Awagarh (1852–1909)
 Balwant Singh, infant Maharaja of Ahmednagar in 1841 for whom Takht Singh served as regent

Democratic
 Balwant Singh Rajoana (born 1967), Indian policeman convicted for participating in an assassination in 1995
 Balwant Singh Thind (died 1990), Indian politician killed in 1990
 Balwant Singh Ramoowalia (born 1942), Indian politician
 Balwant Singh Rakkha (born 1941), Fijian politician
 Balwant Singh Nandgarh, Indian politician, active from 1997
 Balwant Singh Mankotia, Indian politician in Jammu and Kashmir
 Balwant Singh (Haryana politician), member of the Haryana Legislative Assembly
 Balwant Singh (Punjab politician), legislator of Punjab Legislative Assembly.

Sport
 Balwant Singh (footballer) (born 1986), Indian footballer
 Balwant Singh (volleyball) (?–2010), Indian volleyball player

Other
 Balwant Singh Bakhasar, Indian landowner turned bandit, involved in 1971 war with Pakistan